
This is a list of American Civil War brevet generals that served the Union Army. This list of brevet major generals or brevet brigadier generals currently contains a section which gives the names of officers who held lower actual or substantive grades (often referred to as ranks) in the Union Army, were not promoted to full actual or substantive grade generals during or immediately after the war, but were awarded the grade of brevet major general or brevet brigadier general, almost always in recognition of service not as any form of promotion. The first section shows these officers' actual grades and regiments or assignments. Dates in the list are explained below.

The lists of general officers who were in active service as or were promoted to the grade of brigadier general or major general, or in the case of Ulysses S. Grant, lieutenant general, in the Regular Army of the United States at the start of or during the Civil War and of officers who were appointed as brigadier generals or major generals in the volunteer forces which constituted most of the Union Army, who were awarded brevet general grades have been moved to a draft user page for revision and reduction in length. Information on brevet appointments or awards for these officers still may be found at List of American Civil War Generals (Union).

A small number of these awards were made before the generals who received them were promoted to full actual grade generals. Many of the awards were brevet major general grades given to full, actual grade regular army or volunteer force brigadier generals. Some volunteer generals also received brevet awards of general officer grades in the Regular Army of the United States, which were higher awards than brevet awards in the volunteer services. The second and third sections have (or will have) the appointment dates for full general promotions since the officers often began acting in the capacity of general officers before they were confirmed and commissioned. These sections have the same information concerning and dates of the brevet awards as have those in the first section.

Rank dates, other dates
Confusion as to the date of a promotion or a brevet award can result because the date often given in connection with an officer's promotion or award is the date of rank. The appointment, nomination, confirmation and commissioning of most Civil War brevet awards occurred in the years 1866 through 1869 but the great majority of these were antedated for purposes of rank to the "omnibus" date of March 13, 1865. Nonetheless, the date shown together with the brevet award grade in the list is the date of rank, which is simply a date marking seniority or precedence in rank. The date of rank of a promotion or brevet award often is the date associated with the promotion or award in reference to the officer who received the promotion or award in writings about the person or the war. Thus, the rank date is included in the sections of the list below with the grade because of its frequent use in reference to an officer's brevet awards, not because the date of rank is usually any of the significant dates in the process of promotion or award of appointment, nomination, confirmation or commission. Since commission dates are not easily obtained and are usually near the U.S. Senate confirmation dates for brevet awards, which are found in Eicher, Civil War High Commands (2001) and other sources, brevet award confirmation dates are shown for each officer's awards. These dates are frequently the approximate effective date of the appointment or award. The further step of commissioning almost always took place, barring death of the nominee, without great delay, usually within one or a few weeks. Other dates are not shown below due to the absence of ready access to information about appointment dates for brevet awards and to save space.

Some additional significant dates for some officers are shown in the notes, including some appointment or nomination dates if made by President Abraham Lincoln and the date an officer left the service. An appointment or nomination made by President Lincoln means the officer could have exercised command at his brevet grade, if so assigned, and been referred to as a general during the course of the war.

A date in parentheses after "nomination" is the first date the appointment was submitted to the U.S. Senate for confirmation. That nomination was not acted upon or improved and had to be resubmitted (sometimes twice). The date following the date in parentheses is the date of the nomination which Congress acted upon.

Purpose, significance and effect of award
President Lincoln commissioned only 58 brevet grade generals. A few of these awards were even issued posthumously although death of the nominee would usually end the promotion or award process. The list notes (or will note) the officers who were nominated for brevet awards by President Lincoln and confirmed by the U.S. Senate before April 1865. All of the other awards were made by President Andrew Johnson and confirmed by the U.S. Senate during Johnson's term of office. Thus, Civil War brevet awards were almost always honors without any command, operational or assignment significance or extra compensation since the war was over when most of the awards were confirmed and the awards were issued. Most of the officers nominated for brevet awards had been mustered out, or were supernumeraries soon to be mustered out, when the awards were confirmed. Many awards were made to lower grade staff officers for faithful and efficient services.

A few of the brevet generals appointed by President Lincoln did perform valuable service in general officer positions. Their authority was enhanced by assignment to positions with general officer responsibilities, mostly during the last months of the war, by General Grant. Some of the brevet generals appointed later may have served in general officer jobs, generally for short periods of time, during the war. The brevet awards could not convert these officers into generals retroactively no matter how valuable their service may have been. Many other officers with lower full, permanent grades also rendered distinguished temporary service in higher grade assignments without receiving brevet awards so caution must be made about exaggerating the significance of the later brevet award. It may be noted that over 6,000 brevet awards of grades below general were awarded during and after the Civil War. Many of these awards were made to regular army officers with lower permanent grades who were serving in higher grades in the volunteer force or to officers who also received brevet general awards.

The only medal available for award to soldiers of the Union Army was the Medal of Honor so brevet awards were prized as a mark of distinguished service, especially for officers who served with distinction but did not perform the heroic acts on the battlefield. These heroic acts were almost always the basis for the Medal of Honor.

Award process
In outline, the main steps of the promotion or brevet award process were as follows. After a candidate for a general officer commission or brevet award was selected, the Secretary of War, on behalf of the President, would send the candidate an appointment letter. The candidate would be asked to communicate acceptance of the appointment or award, attest to the oath of office and report to a named officer for orders. The letter would note that the appointment was contingent on the President nominating and the U.S. Senate confirming the promotion or award. Nonetheless, the candidate often received orders to begin acting in the appointed office pending the President's nomination and the Senate's confirmation or rejection of the nomination. If a nominee was confirmed, the President and Secretary of War (or of the Navy) would sign and seal a commission and transmit it to the nominee. The appointment was not official or complete until all the steps in the process were completed and the commission was conveyed in writing. Usually this occurred soon after the confirmation of the promotion or award, often within about a week. Since most of the brevet awards were made after the end of the war, candidates would not be told to report to a senior officer for orders unless they were still on duty and might be given some higher or different assignment. Full grade promotions supersede brevet grade promotions and promotions in the regular army supersede promotions to equivalent or lower rank in the volunteer forces.

Definitions, abbreviations
Following the usage of the Eichers in Civil War High Commands, "grade" signifies the position or level in the officer hierarchy (e.g. brigadier general, major general) and "rank" refers to the order of precedence within the grade, signified by the date from which the award "ranks", regardless of the actual date of appointment by the President of the United States or confirmation by the United States Senate. As the Eichers acknowledge, "rank" is commonly used in reference to an officer's grade despite their explanation of the different terms for military officers' positions and precedence. The Eichers effort to change the common usage of the word "rank" for grade is probably futile. This usage can be found in documents that even precede the Civil War. A change in usage might create more confusion than it eliminates but "grade" will be used on this page, especially in the column headings, since the reason for this use is explained in this introduction.

Some abbreviations are used in the entries, especially the notes, to keep the entries more compact. The abbreviation USA means the grade was awarded in the regular United States Army. The abbreviation USV (United States Volunteers) means the grade was awarded in the volunteer army which constituted almost the entire Union Army. All brevet grades are shown with "brevet" or "bvt." Notes are limited for each entry and generally are in a few major categories to keep the size of a large page from increasing more. Many of the brevet (only) general officers and almost all of the regular army or volunteer army actual grade generals have individual pages devoted to them with more information. USMA indicates a graduate of the United States Military Academy at West Point, New York. Medal of Honor awards are noted. A note is made for those killed in action or died of wounds received in action or otherwise died during the war. Resignation, retirement and muster out dates for volunteer officers are (or will be) noted, although they were omitted in the original version of the page. Pre-war and post-war state governors, U.S. Senators and U.S. Representatives are noted. If a specific action is not noted as the reason for the award, it was for services which were described as "meritorious services" or "gallant and meritorious services" or "long and faithful services" or "faithful and meritorious services" "during the war" or some similar form of words, as also noted above. The List of American Civil War Generals (Union) and the individual pages for each general have more details about each officer so details and dates other than those mentioned in this introduction are omitted from the following list.

No Confederate brevet awards
The Confederate government did not award brevet grades to Confederate States Army officers although Confederate army regulations would have allowed them.

Sources
The United States War Department sources (written by former Confederate Brigadier General Marcus Joseph Wright), in the references section, list the generals', and in the case of the Union generals, the brevet generals', grade, rank date, appointment date, and confirmation date. The Confederate generals list is included because it may be used as a reference in a few notes. The other six references have short summaries of each general's life and service. A few of the sources do not list every general, however. Some sources may have information that others do not. All the information in this list is from one or more of these references. The summaries in the references are in alphabetical order. Since the information in this article is from a limited number of sources, all of which are in alphabetical order, in-line notes have been largely omitted since the information is easily found on consecutive pages in one or more of the referenced books. A full listing of citations for each unique entry in one or more boxes for each general or brevet general would show thousands of citations, which would be a large use of space for little real return of information. The information in the list can easily be found and verified by anyone who has access to some or all of the six sources.

Union brevet generals; lower actual, substantive grade

A

Union brevet generals; lower actual, substantive grade

B

Union brevet generals; lower actual, substantive grade

C

Union brevet generals; lower actual, substantive grade

D

Union brevet generals; lower actual, substantive grade

E

Union brevet generals; lower actual, substantive grade

F

Union brevet generals; lower actual, substantive grade

G

Union brevet generals; lower actual, substantive grade

H

Union brevet generals; lower actual, substantive grade

I

Union brevet generals; lower actual, substantive grade

J

Union brevet generals; lower actual, substantive grade

K

Union brevet generals; lower actual, substantive grade

L

Union brevet generals; lower actual, substantive grade

M

Union brevet generals; lower actual, substantive grade

N

Union brevet generals; lower actual, substantive grade

O

Union brevet generals; lower actual, substantive grade

P

Union brevet generals; lower actual, substantive grade

Q

Union brevet generals; lower actual, substantive grade

R

Union brevet generals; lower actual, substantive grade

S

Union brevet generals; lower actual, substantive grade

T

Union brevet generals; lower actual, substantive grade

V

Union brevet generals; lower actual, substantive grade

W

Union brevet generals; lower actual, substantive grade

Y

Union brevet generals; lower actual, substantive grade

Z

See also

List of American Civil War generals (Union)
List of American Civil War generals (Confederate)
List of American Civil War generals (Acting Confederate)
General officers in the Confederate States Army
General officers in the United States

Notes

References
 Eicher, John H., and David J. Eicher, Civil War High Commands. Stanford: Stanford University Press, 2001. .
 Faust, Patricia L., ed., Historical Times Illustrated Encyclopedia of the Civil War. Harper & Row, Publishers, Inc., New York, 1986. . Entries by Faust, various authors.
 Heidler, David S., and Jeanne T. Heidler, eds. Encyclopedia of the American Civil War: A Political, Social, and Military History. New York: W. W. Norton & Company, 2000. . Entries by Heidler and Heidler, various authors.
 Hunt, Roger D. and Jack R. Brown, Brevet Brigadier Generals in Blue. Gaithersburg, MD: Olde Soldier Books, Inc., 1990. .
 Sifakis, Stewart. Who Was Who in the Civil War. New York: Facts On File, 1988. .
 United States War Department, The Military Secretary's Office, Memorandum Relative to the General Officers in the Armies of the United States During the Civil War, 1861–1865 (Compiled from Official Records.) 1906. Retrieved August 5, 2010.
 United States War Department, The Military Secretary's Office, Memorandum relative to the general officers appointed by the President in the armies of the Confederate States 1861–1865 (1908) (Compiled from official records) Caption shows 1905 but printing date is February 11, 1908. Retrieved August 5, 2010.
 Warner, Ezra J. Generals in Blue: Lives of the Union Commanders. Baton Rouge: Louisiana State University Press, 1964. .

Lists of generals
Gen
American brevet union